Lithophane pexata, the plush-naped pinion, is a species of cutworm or dart moth in the family Noctuidae. It is found in North America.

The MONA or Hodges number for Lithophane pexata is 9922.

References

Further reading

 
 
 

pexata
Articles created by Qbugbot
Moths described in 1874